The Argong Formation, also rendered A’ergong, is located in the Inner Mongolia Autonomous Region and was formed during the Cretaceous period.

References

Geology of Inner Mongolia
Geologic formations of China
Cretaceous System of Asia